Danton Relato Remoto (born March 25, 1963) is a Filipino  writer, essayist, reporter, editor, columnist, and professor. Remoto received the first prize at the ASEAN Letter-Writing Contest for Young People.  The award earned Remoto a scholarship at the Ateneo de Manila University in the Philippines.  As a professor, Remoto taught English and Journalism at the Ateneo de Manila University.  Remoto is the chairman emeritus of Ang Ladlad, a lesbian, gay, bisexual, and transgender (LGBT) political party in the Philippines.

Biography
Remoto was born in Basa Air Base, Floridablanca, Pampanga. His father, Francisco Sr., was a soldier while his mother, Lilia Relato, was a music teacher.

Education
In 1983, Remoto obtained his AB in Interdisciplinary Studies from the Ateneo de Manila University.  In 1989, while under the Robert Southwell scholarship, Remoto gained his MA degree in English Literature.  In 1990, while under the British Council Fellowship, Remoto received his Master of Philosophy in Publishing Studies from the University of Stirling in Scotland.  In 2000, Remoto was given the Fulbright Scholarship for Rutgers University in the United States. He also taught Freshman English Composition and Creative Writing: Fiction at Rutgers University. In 2003, Remoto obtained a fellowship from the Asian Scholarship Foundation at the Universiti Kebangsaan Malaysia (National University of Malaysia).  In 2004, Remoto obtained a fellowship from the Asian Scholarship Foundation at the National University of Singapore.  In March 2009, Remoto obtained a PhD in English Studies with a major in Creative Writing from the University of the Philippines Diliman.

Career
From 1986, Remoto worked as a writer, reporter, editor, and columnist for the Philippine Press.  In 1989, Remoto edited Alfredo Navarro Salanga's Buena Vista, a collection of poetry and fiction and was a co-editor of Gems in Philippine Literature.  In 1994, Remoto became a Local Fellow for Poetry the UP Creative Writing Center.  Together with J. Neil Garcia, Remoto edited the so-called Ladlad ("Out of the Closet") series, a succession of gay literature. He taught full-time at the Ateneo de Manila University from 1986 to 2009, and later worked as a Communications Analyst at the United Nations Development Programme and as Head of Research and News Desk Manager at TV5.

He appeared in Gloc-9's music video "Sirena", which depicts the life of a gay person who was maltreated by his father. The music video also featured Boy Abunda.

He also became a radio commentator during Radyo5's heyday until restructuring, and again in 2022 with his new program "Pinoy Konek".

Awards
Remoto was the recipient of several cultural and literary awards and recognition.  In 1979, Remoto won the ASEAN prize for essay writing.  In 1983, he won the Galian sa Arte at Tula award for poetry.  In 1986, Remoto won the PLAC award for poetry.  In 1987, Remoto won the Palanca Award  for essay writing.  He is a three-time Cultural Center of the Philippines (CCP) awardee for poetry.  He won the Stirling District Arts Council Award for poetry and short story writing twice in 1989, and again in 1990.  In 1993, Remoto became the Procyon Prize winner for poetry.  He received the Cultural Center awards for film and video for the screenplay of the documentary House of the Crescent Moon and for the film The Last Parian.  In 2004, Remoto obtained the Philippines Free Press Award for essay writing.  In 2006, he became an awardee of the National Commission on Culture and the Arts Award for poetry translation.  In 2007, Remoto was granted the Philippine Graphic magazine's Nick Joaquin Award for short story writing.

Works
Remoto's writings include the following:

Poetry
Skin, Voices, Faces (1991)
Black Silk Pajamas / Poems in English and Filipino (1996)
Pulotgata; The Love Poems (2004)
Rain
Padre Faura Witnesses The Execution of Rizal

Essays
Seduction and Solitude
X-Factor
Gaydar
Buhay Bading
Rampa: Mga Sanaysay
A Teacher's Tale

Books
Ladlad
Bright,Catholic and Gay
Happy Na, Gay Pa
Riverrun

Filmography
 Tayuan mo at Panindigan!  (AksyonTV, 2011–2012) 
 Remoto Control   (Radyo5 92.3 News FM, 2012-June 2017; Radio Pilipinas 1, Q3 2017–present) 
 Pinoy Konek  (Radyo5 92.3 News FM, 2023–present)

References

External links
Official website 

20th-century Filipino poets
Kapampangan people
Filipino gay writers
University of the Philippines alumni
Academic staff of Ateneo de Manila University
Ateneo de Manila University alumni
Rutgers University alumni
Palanca Award recipients
English-language writers from the Philippines
Writers from Pampanga
Filipino columnists
Filipino journalists
Filipino educators
1963 births
Living people
Ladlad politicians
Gay politicians
Filipino LGBT rights activists
21st-century Filipino poets
Filipino male poets
20th-century male writers
21st-century male writers
21st-century LGBT people
Gay poets